The Iraqi Elite Cup, known officially as the Baghdad Championship and previously known as the Mother of all Battles Championship (Botola Umm Al-Ma'arik), referring to the name that former Iraqi President Saddam Hussein referred to the Gulf War as, was an annual football competition in men's domestic Iraqi football that was usually held at the beginning of each season. It was founded in 1991, and its last edition was the 2003 edition.

The top eight teams of the previous Iraqi Premier League season entered the competition, with the exception of the 1991 and 1993 editions, where the top six teams of the league entered. The teams were split into two groups, and the top two teams from each group advanced to the semi-finals. The winners would contest the final, and the losers would play for third place.

Although the cup was one of the four major domestic trophies attainable by top-flight teams at the time, it was perceived by larger clubs as being of a lower priority to the league championship and the Iraq FA Cup. In the first edition, the winners received a 7k IQD prize money, while the runners-up received 5k IQD. In the second edition, because of the economical changes that accrued on the dinar, the winners were given 150k IQD and the runners-up were given 100k IQD.

History 
The idea of this cup was requested by the administration of Al-Talaba SC to the Iraq Football Association and it was to put the top six teams of the 1990–91 Iraqi National League in a single-elimination competition, because of the lack of Iraqi competitions other than the Iraqi National League and the Iraq FA Cup. The Iraq FA accepted the request on 24 August 1991, and put up a committee to administrate the competition, which decided to make 2 September the opening date. Over 55,000 spectators came to Al-Shaab Stadium, a ground that could only hold 45,000 at the time, to watch the cup final between Al-Zawraa and Al-Quwa Al-Jawiya, which ended with a 3–1 win for Al-Zawraa. After the first edition of the cup that was set up by Al-Talaba, the Iraq Football Association adopted the competition due to its promising reception from fans, and increased the number of participating teams from six to eight.

The tournament was criticised for containing only the top eight teams of the league, because it was thought that Iraqi football needed another competition other than the Iraq FA Cup that allowed clubs from lower divisions to participate. In almost every single edition of the cup, three of the four Baghdad Derby clubs (Al-Quwa Al-Jawiya, Al-Shorta, Al-Talaba and Al-Zawraa) finished in the top four, while in the 2002 and 2003 editions, all of them finished in the top four. All of the four Baghdad Derby teams have won the cup title three times.

Due to the Battle of Baghdad in April 2003 and the end of the rule of the former president Saddam Hussein, the Iraq Football Association decided to change the competition's name from Mother of all Battles Championship to Baghdad Championship due to the former name's resemblance to the Gulf War. It was named the Baghdad Championship because all of the competition's matches were played in Baghdad, being divided between Al-Shorta Stadium, Al-Karkh Stadium, Al-Zawraa Stadium, and Al-Sinaa Stadium. It ended with Al-Zawraa winning the championship. This was the first and last edition of the Baghdad Championship, as the tournament was discontinued after that season. Since then, it has gained the name of Iraqi Elite Cup (Al-Nukhba Cup) due to the fact that it was contested between the best eight teams in the country each year.

Records and statistics

Results

Most successful clubs

List of winning managers

See also 
 Iraq FA Cup
 Iraqi Premier League
 Iraq Football Association

References

External links
 Iraqi Football Website

Football in Baghdad
Football competitions in Iraq